The 1994 Kroger St. Jude International was a men's tennis tournament held in Memphis, Tennessee. The event was part of the Championship Series of the 1994 ATP Tour. It was the 24th edition of the tournament and was held from February 7 through February 14, 1994. Second-seeded Todd Martin won the singles title.

Finals

Singles
 Todd Martin defeated  Brad Gilbert 6–4, 7–5
 It was Martin's 1st singles title of the year, and the 2nd of his career.

Doubles
 Byron Black /  Jonathan Stark defeated  Jim Grabb /  Jared Palmer 6–2, 6–4

References

External links
 ITF tournament edition details
 Official website

Kroger St. Jude International
Sports in Memphis, Tennessee
U.S. National Indoor Championships
Kroger St. Jude International
Kroger St. Jude International
Kroger St. Jude International